This is a list of music-related events in 1817.

Events
 Felix Mendelssohn begins studying composition with Carl Friedrich Zelter.
 Improved form of ophicleide invented by Jean Hilaire Asté in France.

Classical music
Ludwig van Beethoven 
String Quintet, Op.104
Fugue in D major, Op.137
Gesang der Mönche, WoO 104
So oder So, WoO 148
Resignation, WoO 149
Alexandre-Pierre-François Boëly – 30 Caprices, Op. 2
Ferdinando Carulli – 6 Duos for Guitar and Flute, Op. 109
Frederic Chopin – Two Polonaises
Muzio Clementi – Gradus ad Parnassum Volume I is published simultaneously in London, Paris and Leipzig on March 1.
Gaetano Donizetti 
English Horn Concertino, A 459 (premiered June 19 in Bergamo)
Sinfonia for Winds in G minor, A 509 (composed April 19)
Friedrich Dotzauer – Pot-Pourri for Cello and Guitar, Op. 21
John Field 
Nocturne No.4 in A major, H.36
Nocturne No.6 in F major ("Berceuse")
Georg Gerson – Symphony in E-flat major
Mauro Giuliani 
Divertimenti, Op. 78
Preludes, Op. 83
Johann Nepomuk Hummel 
Adagio, Variationen und Rondo über 'Pretty Polly', Op. 75
Variations sur un theme original, Op. 76
Anselm Hüttenbrenner – 6 Variations, Op. 2
Jean-Baptiste Krumpholtz – 2 Harp Duos, Op. 5
Iwan Müller – Clarinet Quartet No. 2
Niccolo Paganini – Violin Concerto No.1, Op.6
Anton Reicha – Andante for Wind Quintet no. 1 in E-flat major
Franz Schubert 
Piano Sonata No.4, D.537
Allegro and Scherzo, D.570 (July)
String Trio in B-flat major, D. 581 (Autumn)
Notable Lieder
Trost, D.523
Schlaflied, D.527
Der Tod und das Mädchen, D.531
Ganymed, D.544
An die Musik, D.547
Die Forelle, D.550
Louis Spohr – String Quartet No.11, Op. 43
Václav Jan Tomášek – 6 Eglogues, Op. 47

Opera
Franz Danzi – Die Probe
Gioacchino Rossini 
La Cenerentola
La Gazza Ladra
Armida
Adelaide di Borgogna

Publications 

 Francesco Galeazzi – Elementi di Musica

Published Popular Music
 "Oft, in the Stilly Night" – w.m. (arr.) Thomas Moore

Births
February 3 – Émile Prudent, composer (died 1863)
February 22 – Niels Gade, composer (d. 1890)
March 2 – Hans Hansen, composer (d. 1878)
March 17
Karl Schroder I, violinist (died 1890)
Julius Stahlknecht, composer (died 1892)
March 24 – Aimé Maillart, composer (d. 1871)
March 28 – Mariano Soriano Fuertes, composer (died 1880)
May 26 –  Emil Erslev, composer (died 1882)
May 27 – Giuseppe Bardari, librettist (died 1861)
May 31 – Édouard Marie Ernest Deldevez, composer (died 1897)
June 13 – Antonio Torres Jurado, Spanish guitar maker (d. 1892)
August 13 – Károly Thern, pianist, conductor and composer (d. 1886)
September 23 - Léon Charles François Kreutzer, music critic, music historian, and composer (d. 1868)  
October 5 – Eduard Franck, German composer (died 1893)
November 12 
Gustav Nottebohm, musicologist (d. 1882)
Carlo Pedrotti, composer and conductor (died 1893) 
November 13
Louis James Alfred Lefébure-Wély, organist (d. 1869)
Henry Brinley Richards, composer (d. 1885)
November 24 – Fritz Spindler, pianist (died 1905)
December 19 – Charles Dancla, composer (died 1907)

Deaths
January 14 – Pierre-Alexandre Monsigny, composer (b. 1729)
January 28 – F.L.Æ. Kunzen, conductor and composer (b. 1761)
March 1 – Luigi Gatti, composer (b. 1740)
June 29 – Ernst Schulze, lyricist and poet (born 1789)
August 24 – Nancy Storace, operatic soprano (b. 1766)
October 11 – Franz Xaver Hammer, gambist, cellist and composer (b. 1741)
October 12 – Johann Franz Xaver Sterkel, composer and pianist (born 1750) 
October 18 – Etienne Méhul, composer (b. 1763)
November 7 – Francesco Pasquale Ricci, composer (b. 1732)
December 1 – Justin Heinrich Knecht, organist and composer (b. 1752)
December 3 – August Eberhard Müller, German composer (born 1767)
December 11 – Max von Schenkendorf, poet and songwriter (born 1783)
date unknown –
John Peacock, Northumbrian piper (b. c. 1756)
Pedro Étienne Solère, composer (born 1753)

References

 
19th century in music
Music by year